New Alliance Party may refer to:

 New Alliance Party (Mexico), a political party in Mexico
 New Alliance Party, a former political party in the United States
 New Alliance Party (Cook Islands)

See also
 New Alliance (Benin)
 New Alliance (Denmark)
 New Alliance for Democracy and Development in Burundi